The Staffordshire Way is a long-distance walk in Staffordshire, England. The path links with the Cheshire Gritstone Trail, the Heart of England Way and the North Worcestershire Path.

The Way was opened in three stages by Staffordshire County Council between 1977 and 1983 and was resurveyed and refurbished with the assistance of the Ramblers' Association to mark the Association's 60th anniversary in 1995.

The route 
It then traverses southeast through Staffordshire's countryside for  passing through Leek, then along the Caldon Canal through the Churnet Valley to Rocester and Uttoxeter. The route then goes southwest through the Trent Valley,  Shugborough Hall  parkland and Cannock Chase (an Area of Outstanding Natural Beauty) to Penkridge. From Penkridge it turns south passing near to Brewood and continuing southwest through the parkland of Chillington Hall and close to Weston Park. It then turns south again passing through Codsall, within half a mile of Perton and near to Patshull Hall and Pattingham. It then continues south near to Enville and Highgate Common before finishing at the  dramatic sandstone ridge of Kinver Edge.

The  section between Rushton Spencer and Cannock Chase is now part of European walking route E2. The path connects with the North Worcestershire Path and the Worcestershire Way at Kinver Edge, the Heart of England Way at Cannock Chase, the Limestone Way at Rocester and the Gritstone Trail in north Staffordshire.

Hazards
It is recommended that you take an Ordnance Survey map when walking the Staffordshire Way as there are patches of the route that are poorly signposted. Parts of the route are frequented less than others and as such can become intensely boggy, especially after heavy and/or prolonged rainfall. As some parts of the route are across farm fields, expect the way ahead to be blocked by occasional herds of dairy cattle and itinerant horses.

Photos of the Staffordshire Way

References

External links
 Staffordshire County Council:  Staffordshire Way page

Footpaths in Staffordshire
Staffordshire Moorlands
Long-distance footpaths in England
County-themed walking routes in the United Kingdom